Following is a list of all Article III United States federal judges appointed by President William McKinley during his presidency. In total McKinley appointed 35 Article III federal judges, including 1 Justice to the Supreme Court of the United States, 6 judges to the United States Courts of Appeals, and 28 judges to the United States district courts.

Additionally, McKinley appointed 3 members of the Article I tribunal Board of General Appraisers (later the United States Customs Court).

From the establishment of the United States courts of appeals on June 16, 1891, until the abolition of the United States circuit courts on December 31, 1911, all United States Circuit Judges where jointly appointed to both the United States court of appeal and the United States circuit court for their respective circuit. Starting January 1, 1912, United States Circuit Judges served only on the United States court of appeal for their respective circuit.

United States Supreme Court justices

Courts of appeals and circuit courts
The United States circuit courts were abolished on January 1, 1912, the final day of service being December 31, 1911.

District courts

Specialty courts (Article I)

Board of General Appraisers

Notes

Renominations

References
General

 

Specific

Sources
 Federal Judicial Center

McKinley

William McKinley-related lists